Acuy is a small island southeast of the town of Queilén. It is about 2 km long and 500 m wide at its largest points, and therefore has only a small population.

The population is mainly devoted to fishing and gathering luga.

See also
 List of islands of Chile

References

External links
 Islands of Chile @ United Nations Environment Programme
 World island information @ WorldIslandInfo.com
 South America Island High Points above 1000 meters
 United States Hydrographic Office, South America Pilot (1916)
 Geography

Islands of Chiloé Archipelago